Tyrone A. Carter (born May 24, 1962) is a Democratic member of the Michigan House of Representatives.

Education 
Carter graduated from Wayne County Sheriff's Police Academy.

Career 
After 25 years, and achieving the rank of Executive Lieutenant, Carter retired from Wayne County Sheriff's Office in 2008. On November 6, 2018, Carter won the election and became a member of Michigan House of Representatives for District 6. Carter currently serves as a member of the Michigan Legislative Black Caucus.

Personal life 
Carter's wife Lisa serves as the District 6 Police Commissioner.
On March 26, 2020, Carter tested positive for COVID-19.

References

External links 
 Tyrone Carter at Ballotpedia
 Tyrone Carter at housedems.com

Living people
African-American state legislators in Michigan
Central Michigan University alumni
Democratic Party members of the Michigan House of Representatives
21st-century American politicians
Year of birth missing (living people)
1960s births
21st-century African-American politicians
20th-century African-American people